The Mowbray Baronetcy, of Warennes Wood in the County of Berkshire, was a title in the Baronetage of the United Kingdom. It was created on 3 May 1880 for the Conservative politician John Mowbray. He served as Judge Advocate General from 1858 to 1859 and from 1866 to 1868 and was Father of the House of Commons from 1898 to 1899. Born John Cornish, he had assumed by Royal licence the surname of Mowbray (which was that of his father-in-law) in lieu of his patronymic in 1847. The second Baronet was also a Conservative politician.

The title became extinct on the death of the sixth baronet on 15 September 2022.

Mowbray baronets, of Warennes Wood (1880)
Sir John Robert Mowbray, 1st Baronet (1815–1899)
Sir Robert Gray Cornish Mowbray, 2nd Baronet (1850–1916)
Sir Reginald Ambrose Mowbray, 3rd Baronet (1852–1916)
Sir Edmund George Lionel Mowbray, 4th Baronet (1859–1919)
Sir George Robert Mowbray, 5th Baronet (1899–1969)
Sir John Robert Mowbray, 6th Baronet (1932–2022), married Lavinia, a daughter of Lt Col. Francis Hugonin, and they had three daughters.

References

Kidd, Charles, Williamson, David (editors). Debrett's Peerage and Baronetage (1990 edition). New York: St Martin's Press, 1990.

Extinct baronetcies in the Baronetage of the United Kingdom